Price Waterhouse v Kwan [2000] 3 NZLR 39 is a cited case in New Zealand regarding liability for negligent misstatements.

Background
Price Waterhouse were the auditors of a law firm. It was later claimed that Price Waterhouse were negligent in their audits resulting in them losing their investments.

Held
As the purpose of the audits was for the protection of clients money, there was sufficient proximity to hold that PW owed them a duty of care, and were accordingly ordered to pay damages.

References

Court of Appeal of New Zealand cases
New Zealand tort case law
2003 in New Zealand law
2003 in case law
PricewaterhouseCoopers